Clark Creek is a  tributary of the Susquehanna River in Dauphin County, Pennsylvania, in the United States. Clark Creek was named for the Clark family who settled near its banks in the 1720s.

The creek is dammed to form DeHart Reservoir, part of the water supply system for the city of Harrisburg.  Clark Creek joins the Susquehanna River upstream of the borough of Dauphin.

See also
List of rivers of Pennsylvania

References

Rivers of Pennsylvania
Tributaries of the Susquehanna River
Rivers of Dauphin County, Pennsylvania